The 1900 SAFL Grand Final was an Australian rules football competition.  beat  27 to 14.

Teams

References 

SANFL Grand Finals
SAFL Grand Final, 1902
September 1900 sports events